Samuel Joseph Dente (April 26, 1922 – April 21, 2002) was a shortstop in Major League Baseball who played for five different teams between 1947 and 1955. He was born in Harrison, New Jersey and played high school baseball at Kearny High School.

Career
A competent infielder and light-hitting batter, Dente was signed by the Boston Red Sox as a free agent in 1941, but almost immediately had to serve in the military during World War II. After discharge, he was a member of the 1946 Scranton Red Sox, a team that posted a 90–43 record in the Eastern League and ranks 90th in the Minor League Baseball all-time teams list. He appeared in 139 games, hitting a respectable .289 average with 77 RBI and eight stolen bases.

Dente reached the majors in 1947 with the Red Sox, playing for them one year before joining the St. Louis Browns (1948), Washington Senators (1949–1951), Chicago White Sox (1952–1953) and Cleveland Indians (1954–1955). His most productive years came with Washington, hitting a career-high .273 with 24 doubles and 53 RBI in 153 games during the 1949 season. In 1950 he posted career-numbers in games (155), runs (56), RBI (59) and extrabases (29), being considered in the American League MVP vote. As a member of the Indians, he served as a backup for George Strickland, appearing in 68 games for a team that won 111 games and advanced to the 1954 World Series. In three Series games, he went 0-for-3 with one run and a walk.

In a nine-season career, Dente was a .252 hitter with four home runs and 214 RBI in 745 games, including 205 runs, 585 hits, 78 doubles, 16 triples, and nine stolen bases. A patient hitter and very hard to strike out, he averaged one strikeout for every 24.16 at-bats (96-to-2320).

Dente died in Montclair, New Jersey, just five days shy of his 80th birthday, and is buried at Holy Cross Cemetery in North Arlington, New Jersey.

References
Notes

Sources
Baseball Almanac
Baseball Library
Baseball Reference
Retrosheet
Baseball in Wartime 
Historic Baseball
Minor League Baseball History: Top 100 Teams

External links

1922 births
2002 deaths
Baseball players from New Jersey
Boston Red Sox players
Burials at Holy Cross Cemetery (North Arlington, New Jersey)
Chicago White Sox players
Cleveland Indians players
Indianapolis Indians players
Kearny High School (New Jersey) alumni
Major League Baseball shortstops
People from Harrison, New Jersey
Sportspeople from Hudson County, New Jersey
St. Louis Browns players
Washington Senators (1901–1960) players